Tamera Marie Lagac Szijarto is a Filipino actress, entrepreneur and beauty pageant titleholder who was crowned Miss Philippines Earth 2004.

Pageantry

Szijarto started as a model in the Philippines in 2003. On the same year, she participated in a provincial beauty pageant for the first time and represented her municipality of Kawit in Cavite and won the Mutya ng Cavite Tourism 2003. In 2004, she won the Miss Lyceum of the Philippines University pageant.

She participated in national pageant and was crowned Miss Philippines Earth 2004 in Quezon City, Philippines in May 2004, by the previous year's winner, Laura Marie Dunlap. Szijarto crowned her successor Genebelle Raagas during the Miss Philippines Earth 2005 pageant finals in Quezon City, Philippines.

She represented her country at Miss Earth 2004 in Manila, Philippines where she placed as one of the Top 8 Finalists in the grand coronation night on October 24, 2004. She was the first ever Philippine candidate to become a finalist in the Miss Earth pageant won by Priscilla Meirelles of Brazil.

Career
Szijarto made her film debut as one of Ronnie Ricketts’ leading ladies in "Mano Mano 3: Arnis, The Lost Art", shown at the Manila Film Festival in June 2004. She played as a policewoman in the movie.

In 2009, Szijarto, a computer engineer by profession became the chief executive officer and founder of a cosmetics shop tameraonline.com as the Philippine's first online cosmetics store. She is also part of Global Image Management, a company that caters to businesses, teens, and professionals in the areas of Image Enhancement and Personality Development.

References

External links
Official Website
 http://www.beautylaboratory.net beauty and makeup blog

Living people
Star Magic
Miss Earth 2004 contestants
Miss Philippines Earth winners
People from Manila
Year of birth missing (living people)